Mohammad Halilula (born 14 February 1952) is a former Afghanistan wrestler, who competed at the 1980 Summer Olympic Games in the bantamweight event.

References

External links
 

Wrestlers at the 1980 Summer Olympics
Afghan male sport wrestlers
Olympic wrestlers of Afghanistan
1952 births
Living people
Place of birth missing (living people)
20th-century Afghan people